Oscar "Zeta" Acosta Fierro (April 8, 1935 – disappeared 1974) was a Mexican-American attorney, politician, novelist and activist in the Chicano Movement. He was most well known for his novels Autobiography of a Brown Buffalo (1972) and The Revolt of the Cockroach People (1973), and for his friendship with American author Hunter S. Thompson. Thompson characterized him as a heavyweight Samoan attorney, Dr. Gonzo, in his 1971 novel Fear and Loathing in Las Vegas. Acosta disappeared in 1974 during a trip in Mexico and is presumed dead.

Life and career 
Oscar Acosta was born in El Paso, Texas, to Manuel and Juanita (née Fierro) Acosta, from Mexico and El Paso, respectively. He was the third child born but second to survive childhood. Acosta had an older brother, Roberto, born in 1934. After the family moved to California, the children were raised in the small San Joaquin Valley rural community of Riverbank, near Modesto. Acosta's father was drafted during World War II.

After finishing high school, Acosta joined the United States Air Force. Following his discharge, he worked his way through Modesto Junior College. Acosta went on to San Francisco State University where he studied creative writing, becoming the first member of his family to get a college education. He attended night classes at San Francisco Law School and passed the state bar exam in 1966. In 1967, Acosta began working locally as an antipoverty attorney for the East Oakland Legal Aid Society.

In 1968, Acosta moved to East Los Angeles and joined the Chicano Movement as an activist attorney, defending Chicano groups and activists. He represented the Chicano 13 of the East L.A. walkouts, members of the Brown Berets, Rodolfo Gonzales, and other residents of the East L.A. barrio. Acosta's controversial defenses earned him the ire of the Los Angeles Police Department, who often followed and harassed him. In 1970, he ran for sheriff of Los Angeles County against Peter J. Pitchess, and received more than 100,000 votes. During the campaign, Acosta was jailed for two days for contempt of court. He vowed that if elected, he would do away with the Sheriff's Department as it was then constituted. Known for loud ties and a flowered attaché case with a Chicano Power sticker, Acosta lost to Pitchess' 1.3 million votes but beat Everett Holladay, chief of police of Monterey Park.

In 1972, Acosta published his first novel, Autobiography of a Brown Buffalo, about a lawyer fighting for the rights of a marginalized people. In 1973, he published The Revolt of the Cockroach People, a fictionalized version of the 1970 Chicano Moratorium as well as an account of the death of Los Angeles Times columnist Rubén Salazar.

Friendship with Hunter S. Thompson
In the summer of 1967, Acosta met author Hunter S. Thompson. In 1971, Thompson wrote an article on Acosta and the injustice in the barrios of East Los Angeles, as well as the death of Salazar, for Rolling Stone magazine, titled "Strange Rumblings in Aztlan". While working on the article, Thompson and Acosta decided that a trip to Las Vegas, Nevada, was in order, so that they could freely discuss the subject matter of the article away from any police supervision. Thompson wrote about this trip in his 1971 novel Fear and Loathing in Las Vegas.

The legal department of the publisher of Fear and Loathing said the book could not be published without clearance by Acosta, as references to him were recognizable. Acosta initially refused the clearance, saying that he was insulted by Thompson's alteration of his race—Thompson had described him as a "300-pound Samoan." He understood, however, that inserting his real name and race would necessitate extensive rewriting and delay publication of the book, so he promised clearance provided that his name and picture would appear on the dustjacket.

Scholar David S. Wills, in High White Notes: The Rise and Fall of Gonzo Journalism, argued that it was Acosta who pushed Thompson to pursue the theme of the American Dream and indeed provided much of the plot of the novel through his actions in Las Vegas. He asserts that this is likely the reason why Acosta felt so aggrieved, citing various letters and audio recordings of the two men. Acosta even complained to one of Thompson's editors, “Hunter has stolen my soul. He has taken my best lines and has used me.”

Although Thompson and Acosta attempted to work together one more time, their relationship was strained by the dispute over Fear and Loathing in Las Vegas and it never fully recovered. After Acosta's death, it took Thompson several years before he wrote an obituary for his friend, “The Banshee Screams for Buffalo Meat.” In it, Thompson called Acosta, “a stupid, vicious quack with no morals at all and the soul of a hammerhead shark.” Ralph Steadman explained that Thompson "berated most of his friends a lot, but somehow it was funny. His way of expressing love for people was to be both angry and insulting."

Disappearance 
In May 1974, Acosta disappeared while traveling in Mazatlán, Sinaloa, Mexico. His son, Marco Acosta, believes that he was the last person to talk to his father. Acosta telephoned his son from Mazatlán, telling him that he was "about to board a boat full of white snow." Marco is later quoted in reference to his father's disappearance: "The body was never found, but we surmise that probably, knowing the people he was involved with, he ended up mouthing off, getting into a fight, and getting killed."

In 1977, Thompson's investigation of Acosta's disappearance, titled "The Banshee Screams For Buffalo Meat," was published in Rolling Stone. According to Thompson, Acosta was a powerful attorney and spokesman, but suffered from an addiction to amphetamines and had a predilection for LSD. Thompson wrote that he believed Acosta was either murdered by drug dealers or was the victim of a political assassination. Others have speculated that Acosta overdosed or suffered a nervous breakdown during his trip.

Motion pictures
The film Where the Buffalo Roam (1980) loosely depicts Acosta's life and his relationship with Thompson. Its name is derived from Thompson's article about Acosta, "The Banshee Screams for Buffalo Meat," in reference to Acosta's book Autobiography of a Brown Buffalo. Actor Peter Boyle portrayed Acosta, whose character is named "Carl Lazlo, Esquire" and Bill Murray portrayed Thompson.

Fear and Loathing in Las Vegas (1998) is a film adaptation of Thompson's 1971 novel of the same name, a fictionalized account of Thompson and Acosta's trip to Las Vegas in 1971. Benicio del Toro portrays Acosta, referred to in the film and novel as "Dr. Gonzo," while Johnny Depp portrayed Thompson (under the alias of Raoul Duke).

The Rise and Fall of the Brown Buffalo (2017) is a documentary of the life and career of Acosta with dramatic reenactments. The documentary was directed by Phillip Rodriguez and produced by Benicio del Toro.

See also
 American literature in Spanish
 Latino literature
 List of people who disappeared

References

Further reading
Autobiography of a Brown Buffalo (1972),  (Random House)
The Revolt of the Cockroach People (1973),  (Knopf)
Oscar "Zeta" Acosta: the uncollected works. Ilan Stavans, editor. (1996) (Arte Público Press)
Hospitable Imaginations: Contemporary Latino/a Literature and the Pursuit of a Readership, a dissertation on Oscar "Zeta" Acosta within the context of Gloria Anzaldúa, Piri Thomas, Giannina Braschi, Sandra Cisneros, Junot Díaz, and Gilbert Hernandez. Christopher Thomas Gonzalez (2012), OhioLink. 
"Thompson's and Acosta's Collaborative Creation of the Gonzo Narrative Style", Shimberlee Jirón-King. Comparative Literature and Culture, Vol 10, Issue 1, Purdue University, 2008.
The Great Shark Hunt: Strange Tales from a Strange Time. Hunter S. Thompson (1979), Ballantine Books,

External links

"Guide to the Acosta Papers" at the California Ethnic and Multicultural Archives

1935 births
1970s missing person cases
20th-century American male writers
20th-century American novelists
Activists for Hispanic and Latino American civil rights
American activists
American male non-fiction writers
American male novelists
American politicians of Mexican descent
American writers of Mexican descent
California lawyers
Hispanic and Latino American autobiographers
American autobiographers
Hispanic and Latino American novelists
Hunter S. Thompson
Missing people
Missing person cases in Mexico
People declared dead in absentia
People from El Paso, Texas
People from Modesto, California
People from Stanislaus County, California
Postmodern writers
San Francisco Law School alumni
San Francisco State University alumni
United States Air Force airmen
Writers from California